Laddivadi railway station (Code: LDVD) is a railway station situated in Laddivadi, Namakkal district in the Indian state of Tamil Nadu. The station is an intermediate station on the newly commissioned – line which became operational in May 2013. The station is operated by the Southern Railway zone of the Indian Railways and comes under the Salem railway division.

References

External links

Salem railway division
Railway stations in Namakkal district